Lesozavodsk is a town in Primorsky Krai, Russia, located on the Ussuri River (Amur's tributary),  from the Sino–Russian border and about  north of Vladivostok, the administrative center of the krai. Population:    37,000 (1972).

History
The first settlement on the site was founded in 1924 in connection with a sawmill. The settlement was originally named Dalles, from the Russian word dalny for "distant" (referring to the Russian Far East) and les for "forest". In 1932, Dalles was merged with the nearby village of Novostroyka, granted urban-type settlement status and renamed Lesozavodsk. Lesozavodsk was granted town status in 1938.

Administrative and municipal status
Within the framework of administrative divisions, it is, together with twenty-one rural localities, incorporated as Lesozavodsk Town Under Krai Jurisdiction—an administrative unit with the status equal to that of the districts. As a municipal division, Lesozavodsk Town Under Krai Jurisdiction is incorporated as Lesozavodsky Urban Okrug.

Transport

Ruzhino railway station of the Trans-Siberian Railway is located in Lesozavodsk.

Military
The 130th Machine Gun Artillery Division of the 5th Army, Far Eastern Military District was based here until 2009 or 2010, when it became a motorized rifle brigade and then a storage base.

Climate
Lesozavodsk has a humid continental climate with cold and dry winters, due to the Siberian High, and hot and humid summers, due to the Southeast Asian monsoons.

Notable people
Sergey Tereshchenko, former Prime Minister of Kazakhstan
Amūru Mitsuhiro, sumo wrestler

References

Notes

Sources

Cities and towns in Primorsky Krai